137 (one hundred [and] thirty-seven) is the natural number following 136 and preceding 138.

In mathematics 
137 is:

 the 33rd prime number; the next is 139, with which it comprises a twin prime, and thus 137 is a Chen prime. 
 an Eisenstein prime with no imaginary part and a real part of the form . 
 the fourth Stern prime.
 a Pythagorean prime: a prime number of the form , where  () or the sum of two squares . 
 a strong prime in the sense that it is more than the arithmetic mean of its two neighboring primes.
 a strictly non-palindromic number and a primeval number.
 a factor of 10001 (the other being 73) and the repdigit 11111111 (= 10001 × 1111).
 using two radii to divide a circle according to the golden ratio yields sectors of approximately 137° (the golden angle) and 222°.
 1/137 = 0.007299270072992700..., so its period value is palindromic and has a period length of only 8.

In physics 
 Since the early 1900s, physicists have postulated that the number could lie at the heart of a grand unified theory, relating theories of electromagnetism, quantum mechanics and, especially, gravity.
 1/137 was once believed to be the exact value of the fine-structure constant. The fine-structure constant, a dimensionless physical constant, is approximately 1/137, and the astronomer Arthur Eddington conjectured in 1929 that its reciprocal was in fact precisely the integer 137, which he claimed could be "obtained by pure deduction". This conjecture was not widely adopted, and by the 1940s, the experimental values for the constant were clearly inconsistent with the conjecture, being roughly 1/137.036. Recent work at the Kastler Brossel Laboratory in Paris reported the most precise measurement yet taking the value of this constant to the 11th decimal place, nearly three times more precise than the 2018 results by a group led by Holger Müller at University of California, Berkeley, with a margin of error of just 81 parts per trillion.
 Physicist Leon M. Lederman numbered his home near Fermilab 137 based on the significance of the number to those in his profession. Lederman expounded on the significance of the number in his book The God Particle: If the Universe Is the Answer, What Is the Question?, noting that not only was it the inverse of the fine-structure constant, but was also related to the probability that an electron will emit or absorb a photon—i.e., Feynman's conjecture. He added that it also "contains the crux of electromagnetism (the electron), relativity (the velocity of light), and quantum theory (Planck's constant). It would be less unsettling if the relationship between all these important concepts turned out to be one or three or maybe a multiple of pi. But 137?" The number 137, according to Lederman, "shows up naked all over the place", meaning that scientists on any planet in the universe using whatever units they have for charge or speed, and whatever their version of Planck's constant may be, will all come up with 137, because it is a pure number. Lederman recalled that Richard Feynman had even suggested that all physicists put a sign in their offices with the number 137 to remind them of just how much they do not know.

In psychology and mysticism 
 137 has been the subject of psychological speculation by Swiss psychiatrist and psychoanalyst Carl Jung concerning his theory of synchronicity. Jung and physicist Wolfgang Pauli, according to the book Jung, Pauli, and the Pursuit of a Scientific Obsession by Emeritus Professor of History and Philosophy of Science at University College London, Arthur I. Miller, Jung and Pauli struggled in their search for a primal number that everything in the world hinges on, as well as a desire to quantify the unconscious.

In the military 
 Boeing C-137 Stratoliner was a VIP transport aircraft from the Boeing 707 jet airliner used by the United States Air Force
 RAF – No. 137 Squadron
 Strike Fighter Squadron 137 (VFA-137) is a United States Navy F/A-18E Super Hornet strike fighter squadron stationed at Naval Air Station Lemoore, California
  Mission Buenaventura-class fleet oiler built during World War II
  was a United States Navy minesweeper during World War II
  was a United States Navy  commissioned during World War II
  was a United States Navy  during World War II
  was the United States Navy  during World War II
  was a United States Navy  during World War II
  was a United States Navy  during World War II
 137e régiment d'infanterie (fr) is a French Infantry Regiment created under 1st Empire (Napoleon Bonaparte)
 137th Infantry Division in Germany was a German major fighting formation between 1940 and 1943 Wehrmacht

In music 
 Cesium_137 is an American synthpop musical group which takes its name from a radioactive isotope
 137 is a 2001 album by The Pineapple Thief
 Rescate 137 is a 2000 album by experimental electronic musician Christian Vogel
 The Fugue for String Quintet in D major, Op. 137 was composed by Beethoven in 1817
 The Gibson ES-137 is a semi-hollow body guitar by Gibson
 137 is a 2009 album by RickWhiteAlbum
 Agent 137 is a female electronic dance music DJ in Washington, DC
 "137 (Death's Hendecaratia)" is a song by Canadian death metal band Mitochondrion
 "137 (Rinse)" is a song by British producer Squarepusher on Music Is Rotted One Note
 "137" is a song by Brand New on the 2017 album Science Fiction
 "Room 137" is a song by Dream Theater on their 2019 album Distance over Time
 "137" aka "One Hundred and Thirty-Seven" is a composition by John L. Walters written for Landscape (band)

In religion 
 The Bible says that Ishmael, Levi and Amram all lived to be 137 years old. The three appearances make it the most common lifespan of individuals in the Bible.
 According to the verse in Genesis (17:17) there was a ten-year age gap between Abraham and Sarah. Sarah died at the age of 127 (Genesis 23:1), thus Abraham was 137 years old at her death. According to Rashi's commentary on Genesis 23:2, Sarah died when she heard that Isaac had almost been sacrificed, thus Abraham was 137 years old at the Binding of Isaac.

In transportation 
 London Buses route 137 is a Transport for London contracted bus route in London
 Boeing 707-347C CC-137 transport aircraft served the Canadian Forces from 1970 to 1997
 Philippine Airlines Flight 137 from Manila overshot the runway while landing at Bacolod City Domestic Airport on March 22, 1998
 137 Avenue is a primary road in Edmonton, Alberta, Canada
 137th Street–City College is a station on the IRT Broadway–Seventh Avenue Line of the New York City Subway in New York City

In other fields 
 137: Jung, Pauli, and the Pursuit of a Scientific Obsession by Arthur I. Miller, describes the friendship of Carl Jung and Wolfgang Pauli and their search for the meaning of 137 in science, medieval alchemy, dream interpretation, and the I Ching.
 The year AD 137 or 137 BC
 137 AH is a year in the Islamic calendar that corresponds to 754 – 755 CE
 137 Meliboea is a large and dark main belt asteroid discovered in 1874
 The atomic number of an element not yet observed called untriseptium
 California Penal Code for "Offer bribe to influence testimony"
 The Samson 137 Indian reserve in Alberta, Canada
 Sonnet 137 by William Shakespeare
 Psalm 137
 The atomic number of the highest allowed element on the periodic table allowed for a point nucleus by the Bohr model and the Dirac equation.
 Caesium-137 is a radioactive isotope of caesium formed by nuclear fission
 The number of atoms in a chlorophyll molecule, for which the chemical formula is C55H72MgN4O5.
 Rick Sanchez, a fictional character from the Adult Swim animated television series Rick and Morty, is from a version of the universe numbered C-137, and is sometimes referred to as "C-137" in contexts where "Rick" would be ambiguous (e.g. there are multiple universes' versions of Rick present).

See also 
 List of highways numbered 137
 United Nations Security Council Resolution 137
 United States Supreme Court cases, Volume 137

Notes

References

External links 

 137 at VirtueScience
 The Mysterious 137
 What is the significance of the number 137 in physics?

Integers